Afigya Sekyere District is a former district that was located in Ashanti Region, Ghana. Originally created as an ordinary district assembly in 1988, which it was created from part of the former Kwabre-Sekyere District Council; untl the western part of the district (the Afigya portion) was split off to become the northern portion of Afigya-Kwabre District on 1 November 2007 (effectively 29 February 2008); while the remaining portion has since then been officially renamed as Sekyere South District. The district assembly was located in the eastern part of Ashanti Region and had Agona as its capital town.

Sources
 Sekyere South Districts

Districts of Ashanti Region